Summer Time: Travel Back is a 2022 Russian children's fantasy comedy film directed by Karen Zaharov and Armen Ananikyan.

It was theatrically released on April 28, 2022.

Plot 
Four friends, while in the Artek camp, made wishes at the magic tree, as a result of which they ended up in the Crimean Peninsula, the Soviet Union in 1988 and met their parents. To get back, they will have to establish contact with their parents, as quarrels await them in the future.

Cast 
 Daniil Bolshov as Roma Kovalev (English: Romka)
 Aleksey Onezhen as Yarik Lebedev
 Elizaveta Anokhina as Nikoletta Osipova
 Daniil Muravyov-Izotov as Elisey Osipov (English: Yelisey)
 Mikhail Galustyan as Sergey Kurochkin in 1988
 Ekaterina Klimova as Roma's mother
 Sergey Bezrukov as Yura Kovalev, Roma's father
 Vladislav Semiletkov as Yura Kovalev as a child in 1988
 Yevgeny Pronin as Igor Lebedev, Yarik's father
 Denis Kucher as Igor Lebedev as a child in 1988
 Yan Tsapnik as Yaroslav Lebedev in 1988, Yarik's grandfather
 Nadezhda Mikhalkova as Ira Osipova, Nikoletta and Elisey's mother
 Marta Timofeeva as Ira Osipova as a child in 1988
 Stanislav Duzhnikov as Vasya Osipov, Nikoletta and Elisey's father
 Yan Alabushev as Vasya Osipov as a child in 1988
 Lyudmila Artemyeva as Olga in 1988
 Elizaveta Moryak as Elizaveta in 1988 (English: Yelizaveta)

Cameos
 Sergey Zhukov
 Endzhel Zhukov as Sergey Zhukov as a child in 1988
 Nika Zhukova as a member of a musical group

Production
Principal photography of the full-length started in early May 2019 on the territory of the Artek in the Republic of Crimea, Russia. In early June, the soloist of the group “Hands Up!” joined the film crew as an actor. Sergey Zhukov (musician). Moreover, the singer came to Artek to shoot not alone, but with his family: Zhukov's children Nika and Endzhel starred in the film, as the artist told fans on his Instagram microblog.

References

External links 
 

2022 films
2020s Russian-language films
2020s children's fantasy films
2020s fantasy comedy films
2020s children's comedy films
Russian children's fantasy films
Russian fantasy comedy films
Russian children's comedy films
Films about summer camps
Films about time travel
Films set in 1988
Films set in 2021
Films shot in Crimea
Films shot in Russia